State Highway 128 (SH 128) is a  long state highway in the Denver, Colorado metro area. SH 128's western terminus is at SH 93 south of Boulder, and the eastern terminus is at Interstate 25 (I-25) in Westminster.

Route description
The route begins in the west at a junction with SH 93 roughly thirteen miles south of Boulder. From there, the road proceeds eastward into the northern portions of the Denver metropolitan area. The road passes through portions of the cities of Superior, Broomfield, Northglenn, and Westminster and crosses SH 121 before being split by a  section of concurrency with U.S. Route 287 (US 287) and again resuming its course towards its eastern terminus at exit 223 of I-25 in the city limits of Westminster.

 there is a brief gap of much less than a mile between the junction of SH 128 and SH 121 and the junction of SH 121 and US 287 that is not even nominally part of SH 128. This gap is due to be closed in 2018 by a mile-long connector that began construction in 2009; there was a five-year hiatus from 2010 to 2015 during negotiations with BNSF. When construction is complete, the total end-to-end length, including the section that is nominally concurrent with US 287, will be .

History
The route was established in the early 1920s, when it began at Federal Boulevard and ended at SH 185 (now deleted). A section from US 85 to US 6 was added by 1939 and deleted by 1949. The west terminus was extended from US 36 to Indiana Street in 1965 and to its current terminus at SH 93 two years later.

Major intersections

Notes

References

External links

128
Transportation in Boulder County, Colorado
Transportation in Broomfield, Colorado
Transportation in Adams County, Colorado
Thornton, Colorado